Alois Mock (10 June 1934 – 1 June 2017) was an Austrian politician and member of the Austrian People's Party (ÖVP). He was Vice Chancellor of Austria from 1987 to 1989. As foreign minister, he helped take Austria into the European Union.

Life
Born in Euratsfeld, Lower Austria, to August and Mathilde Mock, he studied law at the University of Vienna and later international law in Bologna and Brussels. In Vienna, he became a member of K.A.V. Norica Wien, a Roman Catholic student fraternity, which is a member of the Cartellverband.
From 1961, he advised Austrian chancellor Josef Klaus on European Economic Community and EFTA policies. From 1962 till 1966, he worked at Austria's mission to the OECD in Paris. In 1966 he became Klaus's cabinet secretary. From 1969 to 1970 was the youngest education minister in Austrian history. 

After the parliamentary elections 1971 - in which the Social Democratic Party of Austria (SPÖ) under Bruno Kreisky won a majority — he became a member of parliament and mayor of Euratsfeld. From 1971 to 1978, he  chaired the ÖAAB, the most important grouping of the ÖVP. From 1978 to 1987, he was the leader of the ÖVP parliamentary group, and from 1979, he also was ÖVP federal party chairman. He was later to be succeeded by Josef Riegler, Erhard Busek and Wolfgang Schüssel. In 1979, Mock became President of the European Democrat Union (EDU), and from 1983 to 1987 also was president of the International Democratic Union (IDU). At the 1983 elections, the ÖVP obtained nearly the same percentage as Kreisky's SPÖ. Kreisky didn't want to go on without an absolute majority and stepped down. 

Following the 1986 elections, Alois Mock was Austrian vice chancellor in the government of Franz Vranitzky (SPÖ) from 1987 to 1989. From 1987 to 1995, he was foreign minister, leading Austria into the European Union. He became one of Austria's most popular politicians. In June 1989, together with his Hungarian colleague Gyula Horn, he cut the wires of the Iron Curtain near Sopron at the fortified border to Communist neighbour Hungary. As a result, during the following months, thousands of East German citizens were able to exit the Eastern Bloc 

In 1991, he urged Hans-Dietrich Genscher and Helmut Kohl to recognize Croatia and Slovenia as independent states as soon as possible.

In November 1989 Mock was one of the founders of the Central European cooperative Pentagonale, which later grew from 5 countries to the 18 of the CEI (Central European Initiative). In 1999, he retired from parliament because of Parkinson's disease. At the time of his death Mock was a Member of the Advisory Board of the Global Panel Foundation, an NGO that works behind the scenes in crisis areas around the world.

Death
Mock died on 1 June 2017 from complications of Parkinson's disease at the age of 82.

Honours and awards
Grand Gold Medal with Ribbon for Services to the Republic of Austria
Golden Commander's Cross with the Star of Honour for Services to the province of Lower Austria
Grand Gold Medal of the province of Upper Austria
Medal of Tyrol
Large Order Montfort of Vorarlberg
Carinthian Order in Gold
Grand Cross of Merit of the Federal Republic of Germany
Grand Cross of Merit of the Italian Republic
Legion of Honour (France)
Grand Cross of the Order of Orange-Nassau (Netherlands)
Grand Cross of the Order of Merit of the Principality of Liechtenstein
Grand Order of King Dmitar Zvonimir (Croatia)
Order of the Dragon of Bosnia
Mother Teresa Medal (Albania)
Grand Cross of Merit of the Republic of Cyprus
Order of Merit of the Republic of Poland
Order of Stara Planina, 1st class (Bulgaria)
Order of the Star of Jordan (Jordan)
Grand Officer's Cross of the Order of Umayyad Syria
Order of Diplomatic Service Merit Gwanghwa Medal (South Korea)
Grand Cross of the Order of Bernardo O'Higgins (Chile)
Grand Cross of the Order of the Liberator San Martin (Argentina)
Star of Mahaputera, 2nd class (Indonesia)
Order of the Rising Sun (Japan)
Grand Cross of the Order of St. Gregory
Grand Commander of the Order of the Star of Romania
Grand Order of Merit of South Tyrol
Peace Connection Mostar (Bosnia-Herzegovina)
Commander's Cross with the Star of Order of Merit of the Republic of Hungary
Great merit of the Province of South Tyrol (Alto Adige)
National Order of faithful service in the rank of Commander (Romania)

References

External links
The Global Panel Foundation

|-
| width="30%" align="center" | Preceded by:Josef Taus
| width="40%" align="center" | Chair of the Austrian People's Party1979–1989
| width="30%" align="center" rowspan=2| Josef Riegler
|-
| width="30%" align="center" | Preceded by:Norbert Steger
| width="40%" align="center" | Vice-Chancellor of Austria1987–1989
|-
| width="30%" align="center" | Preceded by:Peter Jankowitsch
| width="40%" align="center" | Minister of Foreign Affairs1987–1995
| width="30%" align="center" | Succeeded by:Wolfgang Schüssel
|-

1934 births
2017 deaths
Burials at Döbling Cemetery
Austrian Ministers of Defence
Foreign ministers of Austria
Members of the National Council (Austria)
Neurological disease deaths in Austria
Deaths from Parkinson's disease
Vice-Chancellors of Austria
Austrian People's Party politicians
Grand Crosses 1st class of the Order of Merit of the Federal Republic of Germany
Recipients of the Decoration for Services to the Republic of Austria
Knights Grand Cross of the Order of Merit of the Italian Republic
Commander's Crosses with Star of the Order of Merit of the Republic of Hungary (civil)
Recipients of the Legion of Honour
Knights Grand Cross of the Order of Orange-Nassau
Recipients of the Order of Merit of the Republic of Poland
Grand Crosses of the Order of the Liberator General San Martin
Recipients of the Order of the Rising Sun
Knights Grand Cross of the Order of St Gregory the Great
Recipients of the Order of the Star of Romania